Strugari is a commune in Bacău County, Western Moldavia, Romania. It is composed of six villages: Cetățuia, Iaz, Nadișa, Petricica, Răchitișu and Strugari.

References

Communes in Bacău County
Localities in Western Moldavia